Adhikar (Hindi अधिकार, Rights) is a social drama film directed by Pramathesh Barua, made in 1939 in Hindi and Bengali languages, and produced by New Theatres.

Cast 

 Pramathesh Barua as Nikhilesh
 Jamuna Barua as Indira
 Pahari Sanyal as Ratan
 Menaka Devi as Radha
 Ushabati
 Pankaj Mullick
 Rajlakshmi Devi
 Sailen Choudhury
 Jagdish Sethi
 Indu Mukherjee

References

External links 

 Adhikar on indiancine.ma

1939 films
Articles containing video clips
1930s Hindi-language films
Indian drama films
1938 drama films
1938 films
Indian black-and-white films
1939 drama films
Hindi-language drama films
Films scored by Timir Baran